Bussigny railway station is a railway station in the municipality of Bussigny, in the Swiss canton of Vaud. It is an intermediate stop on multiple standard gauge lines of Swiss Federal Railways.

Services 
 the following services stop at Bussigny:

 RER Vaud:

References

External links 
 
 

Railway stations in the canton of Vaud
Swiss Federal Railways stations